The Saaremaa official football team is the official association football team of the island of Saaremaa in Estonia.  Saaremaa are not members of FIFA or UEFA. They are not eligible to enter either the World Cup or European Championship.

They mainly play officially in Island Games. The team is mostly packed with players from FC Kuressaare and JK Sörve.

Results and fixtures

2020

Selected Internationals

Tournaments

Island Games record

Squad 2009
The following players were in the Island Games squad in 2009.
(GK) Roland Kütt (FC Kuressaare)
(GK) Rait Hansen (JK Sörve)
Taavi Azarov (FC Kuressaare)	
Tõnu Ilves (JK Sörve)
Märt Kluge (FC Kuressaare)	
Jaanis Kriska (FC Kuressaare)	
Rene Aljas (FC Kuressaare)	
Sander Laht (JK Sörve)
Aivo Laul (FC Kuressaare)	
Kristjan Leedo (JK Sörve)
Kalle Lepp (FC Kuressaare)	
Amor Luup (JK Sörve)
Kaarel Mai (JK Sörve)
Pelle Pohlak (FC Kuressaare)
Mario Pruul (JK Sörve)
Martti Pukk (FC Kuressaare)	
Urmas Rajaver (FC Kuressaare)	
Kristo Salumaa (JK Sörve)
Elari Valmas (JK Sörve)
Sander Viira (FC Kuressaare)

References

External links
National football team

European national and official selection-teams not affiliated to FIFA
Football in Estonia
Saaremaa